Chausseestraße is a major street in the centre of Berlin, located in the district of Mitte. It is 1.7 kilometres long. Many notable buildings and structures are located along the street, including the Headquarters of the Federal Intelligence Service (BND). During the Cold War, the Chausseestraße crossing point, directly adjacent to the new BND headquarters, was one of the main crossing points between West Berlin and East Germany.

References

Streets in Berlin
Mitte